Peritassa is a genus of plants in the family Celastraceae.

Species include:
 Peritassa killipii A.C.Sm.

 
Celastrales genera
Taxonomy articles created by Polbot